Chinese desserts are sweet foods and dishes that are served with tea, along with meals or at the end of meals in Chinese cuisine. The desserts encompass a wide variety of ingredients commonly used in East Asian cuisines such as powdered or whole glutinous rice, sweet bean pastes, and agar. Due to the many Chinese cultures and the long history of China, there are a great variety of desserts of many forms.

Types
The desserts found in China can be roughly divided into several types.

Bing

Bing are baked wheat flour based confections. These are either similar to the short-pastry crust of western cuisine or flaky puff pastry, the latter of which is often known as su. The preferred fat used for bing is usually lard. Common bing types include moon cake, sun cake (Beijing and Taiwan varieties) and wife cake.

Candies
Chinese candies and sweets, called táng, are usually made with cane sugar, malt sugar, and honey. These sweets often consists of nuts or fruits that are mixed into syrup whole or in pastes to flavour or give the candies their textures. Dragon's beard candy, and White Rabbit Creamy Candy are a some examples of this category.

Guo

Gao or Guo ( or ) are rice based snacks that are typically steamed and may be made from glutinous or normal rice. These rice based snacks have a wide variety of textures and can be chewy, jelly-like, fluffy or rather firm and unlike bings very different from western pastries. Various types of gao include Nian gao, Bai Tang Gao, Tangyuan and Ang Ku Kueh.

Ices
Shaved ice desserts with sweet condiments and syrup is common eaten as a dessert in Chinese culture. Ice cream is also commonly available throughout China.

Jellies
Chinese jellies are known collectively in the language as jellies or ices ( or ). Many jelly desserts are traditionally set with agar and are flavored with fruits, though gelatin based jellies are also common in contemporary desserts. Some Chinese jellies, such as the grass jelly and the aiyu jelly set by themselves.

Soups
Chinese dessert soups ( or ) typically consists of sweet and usually hot soups and custards. They are collectively known as tong sui in Cantonese. Some of these soups are made with restorative properties in mind, in concordance with traditional Chinese medicine. A commonly eaten dessert soup is douhua.

See also
 Hangwa – Korean confections
 Wagashi'' – Japanese confections
 Chinese bakery products
 Huangqiao Sesame Cake

References